In medicine, confusion is the quality or state of being bewildered or unclear. The term "acute mental confusion" is often used interchangeably with delirium in the International Statistical Classification of Diseases and Related Health Problems and the Medical Subject Headings publications to describe the pathology. These refer to the loss of orientation, or the ability to place oneself correctly in the world by time, location and personal identity. Mental confusion is sometimes accompanied by disordered consciousness (the loss of linear thinking) and memory loss (the inability to correctly recall previous events or learn new material).

Etymology
The word confusion derives from the Latin word, confundo, which means "confuse, mix, blend, pour together, disorder, embroil."

Causes
Confusion may result from drug side effects or from a relatively sudden brain dysfunction.  Acute confusion is often called delirium (or "acute confusional state"), although delirium often includes a much broader array of disorders than simple confusion.  These disorders include the inability to focus attention; various impairments in awareness, and temporal or spatial dis-orientation.  Mental confusion can result from chronic organic brain pathologies, such as dementia, as well.

Other

 Acute stress reaction
 Alcoholism
 Anemia
 Anticholinergic toxicity
 Anxiety
 Brain damage
 Brain tumor
 Concussion
 Dehydration
 Encephalopathy
 Epileptic seizure
 Depression
 Fatigue
 Fever
 Brain injury
 Heat stroke
 Hypoglycemia
 Hypothermia
 Hypothyroidism
 Jet lag
 Kidney failure
 Kidney infection (pyelonephritis)
 Lactic acidosis
 Lassa fever
 Lewy body dementia
 Listeria
 Lyme disease
 Meningitis
 Postpartum depression & Postpartum psychosis
 Psychotic Disorder
 Reye's syndrome
 Rocky Mountain spotted fever (RMSF)
 Schizophrenia
 Sick building syndrome
 Sleep apnea
 Stroke
 Yellow fever
 STDs & STIs
 Streptococcal Infections
 Toxicity
 Toxic shock syndrome
 Transient ischemic attack (TIA, Mini-Stroke)
 Vitamin B12 deficiency
 Acute Porphyria
 West Nile virus

Differential diagnosis
The most common causes of drug induced acute confusion are dopaminergic drugs (used for the treatment of Parkinson's disease), diuretics, tricyclic, tetracyclic antidepressants and benzodiazepines or alcohol.  The elderly, and especially those with pre-existing dementia, are most at risk for drug induced acute confusional states.  New research is finding a link between vitamin D deficiency and cognitive impairment (which includes "foggy brain").

See also
 Cognitive distortion

References

External links 

 National Library of Medicine - National Institutes of Health

Cognitive dissonance
Emotions
Neurology
Symptoms and signs of mental disorders
Failure
Mental states
Cognitive neuroscience
Error
Anxiety

de:Verworrenheit